A Jazz Celebration of The Allman Brothers Band is an album by the Big Band of Brothers. Ten songs made famous by The Allman Brothers Band receive big band arrangements. The album was inspired by Bob Curnow's L.A. Big Band 1994 tribute album The Music of Pat Metheny & Lyle Mays. Like the Allman Brothers, Big Band of Brothers is composed of musicians from the southeastern U.S. The album includes guest appearances by trombonist Wycliffe Gordon, guitarist Jack Pearson, and vocalists Marc Broussard and Ruthie Foster.

Tour package
In October 2020, American Songwriter premiered a live performance of the project from January 2019.

Critical reception
DownBeat magazine editor Bobby Reed wrote, "The album provides a new prism through which to appreciate the music of an iconic band, many of whose founding members are no longer with us". JazzTimes critic Jeff Tamarkin wrote, "That it's a larger ensemble bringing the Allmans' music into the jazz realm, rather than a smaller combo, is a curious but ultimately brilliant ploy." Tom Clarke at Blues Music magazine called the album "a set of songs that mesmerize by their complexity, yet are fluid and easy to enjoy". Jedd Beaudion of PopMatters wrote, "This recording is as entertaining and scintillating as Coltrane's "Live" at the Village Vanguard, the Brothers' own Eat a Peach or those legendary At Fillmore East sets."

Track listing

Personnel
 Mart Avant – trumpet, flugelhorn
 Rob Alley – trumpet, flugelhorn
 Barney Floyd – trumpet, flugelhorn
 Chris Gordon – trumpet, flugelhorn
 Billy Bargetzi – trombone
 Chad Fisher – trombone
 Bill Huber – trombone
 Brandon Slocumb – bass trombone
 Jimmy Bowland – alto saxophone
 Mace Hibbard – alto saxophone
 Kelley O'Neal – alto saxophone
 Dick Aven – tenor, soprano saxophone
 Nathan McLeod – tenor saxophone
 Steve Collins – baritone saxophone
 Andy Nevala – piano, Hammond B-3, Rhodes
 Matt Casey – guitar
 Tom Wolfe – guitar
 Abe Becker – double bass, bass guitar
 Chris Kozak – double bass, bass guitar
 David Ray – double bass, bass guitar
 Mark Lanter – drums
 Dave Crenshaw – congas, other percussion
 Marc Broussard – vocals 
 Ruthie Foster – vocals
 Wycliffe Gordon – soprano trombone 
 Jack Pearson – slide guitar

References

2019 albums
Jazz albums by American artists
Tribute albums